Teresa Wilson is an American, former collegiate right-handed softball pitcher and head coach, originally from Pickering, Missouri. She attended and played for the Missouri Tigers in the defunct Big Eight Conference from 1980-83. For her years of eligibility in the NCAA Division I, she is the career leader in ERA and WHIP for the Tigers, which also rank top-10 in the NCAA. She successfully served as the softball head coach at Oregon, Minnesota, Washington, and Texas Tech from 1986-08. She was a coach for the Carolina Diamonds and Beijing Eagles of National Pro Fastpitch (NPF).

Coaching career
She was a coach for the Carolina Diamonds and Beijing Eagles of National Pro Fastpitch (NPF).

It was during her 11-year stint leading the University of Washington that she achieved her greatest coaching accomplishments. Her Huskies reached the National Collegiate Athletic Association (NCAA) Women's College World Series six times, making the national championship game in 1996 and 1999. However, UW removed Wilson as head coach amidst revelations the team physician had improperly distributed prescription drugs to the players. She sued the university in U.S. federal court, but the judge ruled against her claim of gender discrimination.

Wilson also led the University of Oregon to the Women's College World Series, in 1989.

She had a long coaching career in college softball, most recently as pitching coach for the Arizona Wildcats softball team from 2009 to 2011. Before that, she served as the head coach at Oregon, Minnesota, Washington, and Texas Tech, compiling 839 wins overall, 526 losses, and 1 tie, coaching athletes Heather Tarr, Jennifer Spediacci and Jenny Topping and achieving No. 1 ranking for Washington, as well as two national runner up finishes.

At a press conference in China, the 2017 NPF expansion team Beijing Shougang Eagles announced that Wilson would be their first head coach.

Statistics

Head coaching record

References

Year of birth missing (living people)
Living people
Softball players from Missouri
Missouri Tigers softball players
Arizona Wildcats softball coaches
Texas Tech Red Raiders softball coaches
Oregon Ducks softball coaches
Minnesota Golden Gophers softball coaches
Washington Huskies softball coaches
American softball coaches
United States women's national softball team coaches